Judge Stevens may refer to:

John Paul Stevens (1920–2019), judge of the United States Court of Appeal for the Seventh Circuit before becoming an associate justice of the Supreme Court of the United States
Joseph Edward Stevens Jr. (1928–1998), judge of the United States District Courts for the Eastern and Western Districts of Missouri
Harold A. Stevens (1907–1990), judge of the New York Court of General Sessions
Robert S. Stevens (judge) (1916–2000), judge of the Los Angeles County Superior Court

See also
Justice Stevens (disambiguation)
Judge Stephens (disambiguation)